The Genesee Street Hill–Limestone Plaza Historic District is a historic district in Fayetteville, New York that was listed on the National Register of Historic Places in 1982.  The western border of the district is Limestone Creek.  The district includes multiple Greek Revival houses, as well as Italianate and Federal architecture styles, along East Genesee Street as it rises from Limestone Plaza to Chapel Street, near the top of East Genesee Street Hill (which is the village center of Fayetteville).

It includes a  area.

Grover Cleveland boyhood home
The district includes the boyhood home of U.S. President Grover Cleveland, one house away from Genesee Street.

References

External links

Houses on the National Register of Historic Places in New York (state)
Federal architecture in New York (state)
Italianate architecture in New York (state)
Historic districts in Onondaga County, New York
Historic districts on the National Register of Historic Places in New York (state)
Manlius, New York
National Register of Historic Places in Onondaga County, New York